George Innes (born 8 March 1938) is a British actor.

Stage career
Innes was born in Stepney, East London, and began his career on the stage with the National Theatre of Great Britain under Laurence Olivier. Before that, he trained at Toynbee Hall and evening classes at the London Academy of Music and Dramatic Art (LAMDA), where he was awarded the Shakespeare Cup for excellence. He appeared in the Bernard Kops play The Dream of Peter Mann at the Edinburgh Festival and on a tour of Great Britain, directed by Frank Dunlop, under whom he had trained at Toynbee Hall and LAMDA. His final year of study and training was at the Bristol Old Vic School. He worked with Dunlop again in The Pantomime at the Bristol Old Vic, before a season at Nottingham Playhouse with Dunlop and John Neville.

Other theatre credits include working for The Royal Court production company in Chips with Everything, which played in the West End and on Broadway. He appeared in Othello (understudying Frank Finlay's Iago) with Olivier at the National Theatre at Chichester and The Old Vic. Other performances in this period include roles in Dutch Courtesan, Mother Courage, Hobson's Choice, and The Master Builder. At the National Theatre at South Bank, he appeared in Tom Stoppard's Jumpers (Pieter Rogers directing), Bedroom Farce (directed by Peter Hall, transferring to the West End), and The Vortex at the Ahmanson Theatre in Los Angeles, (with Bob Ackerman directing). In 1993–94 he appeared in The Rise and Fall of Little Voice with the Steppenwolf Theatre Company, with Simon Curtis directing in Chicago, a production which appeared on Broadway. Returning to London, he performed at the Southwark Playhouse in Rosmersholm (1997) and Riders to the Sea (2005).

In 2009 he appeared off-Broadway in The Lodger at the Workshop Theatre (Harris Yulin directing). There he developed his one-man show called Tribute, based on the Ages of Man by Sir John Gielgud. It was also performed at The Players, a theatrical club in New York City. The show played during the August 2009 Edinburgh Fringe Festival to excellent reviews. In March 2010, he performed Tribute at the Barron's Court Pub Theatre in London, receiving these reviews: "... the whole show centres around a superb talent: not Gielgud's but that of George Innes. The veteran performer has a marvellously warming presence with a deep velvet voice that could make a line from Avenue Q sound profound ... Tribute really is a display of extraordinary talent." He performed the show at the Workshop Theatre in New York, touring westward to California.

Film career
Innes's film career includes Billy Liar (1963, directed by John Schlesinger), Charlie Bubbles (1968, directed by Albert Finney), Before Winter Comes (1968, directed by J. Lee Thompson), The Italian Job (1969, directed by Peter Collinson), The Last Valley (1971, directed by James Clavell), Gumshoe (1971, directed by Stephen Frears), Pope Joan (1972, directed by Michael Anderson), Diamonds on Wheels (1973, directed by Jerome Courtland), A Bridge too Far (1977, directed by Richard Attenborough), Sweeney 2 (1978, directed by Tom Clegg), The Medusa Touch (1978, directed by Jack Gold), The Odd Job (1978, directed by Peter Medak), Quadrophenia (1979, directed by Franc Roddam), A Tale of Two Cities (1980, directed by Jim Goddard), Shōgun (1980, directed by Jerry London), Goliath Awaits (1981, directed by Kevin Connor), Ivanhoe (1982, directed by Douglas Camfield), Ordeal by Innocence (1984, directed by Desmond Davis) and Morons from Outer Space (1985, directed by Mike Hodges).

His recent films include Shiner (2000, directed by John Irvin), The Life and Adventures of Nicholas Nickleby (2001, directed by Stephen Whittaker), Last Orders (2001, directed by Fred Schepisi), Master and Commander: The Far Side of the World (2003, directed by Peter Weir), Things To Do Before You're 30 (2005, directed by Simon Shore), Stardust (2007, directed by Matthew Vaughn) and Elizabeth: The Golden Age (2007, directed by Shekhar Kapur).

Television career
Innes has been twice nominated for an Emmy Award for his work in television. Credits include classic British and American programmes: Alfred in Upstairs, Downstairs (Season 1 and 3); "Dirty" Harry in Minder; Jumbo in Budgie (Series 1); Wilkins in Danger UXB (13 episodes); I, Claudius; The Good Life (1 episode); Thriller (1975); Open All Hours; Rumpole of the Bailey; QED; Masada; Hill Street Blues; Magnum, P.I.; Cagney & Lacey; M*A*S*H; Hart to Hart; The Ruth Rendell Mysteries ("Mouse in the Corner"); Adam Bede; Seekers; Agatha Christie ("A Caribbean Mystery"); Noble House; Midsomer Murders ("Who Killed Cock Robin"); Menace; The Brief; Get Some In!; Newhart and After Henry.

Filmography

External links
 
 George Innes website

1938 births
Living people
People from Wapping
English male film actors
English male television actors
Alumni of the London Academy of Music and Dramatic Art
20th-century English male actors
21st-century English male actors